The United States Senate Energy and Natural Resources Subcommittee on Water and Power is one of four subcommittees of the U.S. Senate Energy and Natural Resources Committee.

Jurisdiction
This subcommittee's jurisdiction includes oversight and legislative responsibilities for: United States Bureau of Reclamation irrigation and reclamation projects, including related flood control purposes; federal power marketing administrations, (e.g., Bonneville Power Administration, Southwestern Power Administration, Western Area Power Administration, Southeastern Power Administration); energy development impacts on water resources; groundwater resources and management; hydroelectric power; and energy related aspects of deepwater ports.

Members, 118th Congress

See also
 U.S. House Natural Resources Subcommittee on Water and Power

References

External links
U.S. Senate Energy and Natural Resources Subcommittee on Water and Power, official web site

Energy Senate Water and Power